Neurocordulia is a genus of dragonfly in the family Corduliidae. They are commonly known as shadowdragons.

They are confined to  the eastern United States and Canada, where their habitat is clean forest streams and lakes.

The genus contains the following species:
Neurocordulia alabamensis  – Alabama shadowdragon
Neurocordulia michaeli  – broad-tailed shadowdragon
Neurocordulia molesta  –  smoky shadowdragon
Neurocordulia obsoleta  – umber shadowdragon
Neurocordulia virginiensis  – cinnamon shadowdragon
Neurocordulia xanthosoma  –  orange shadowdragon
Neurocordulia yamaskanensis  – stygian shadowdragon

References

Corduliidae
Anisoptera genera
Taxa named by Edmond de Sélys Longchamps
Taxonomy articles created by Polbot